The University of Wisconsin–Oshkosh, Fox Cities Campus (formerly the University of Wisconsin–Fox Valley) is a branch campus of the University of Wisconsin–Oshkosh and a member of the 26 campus University of Wisconsin System.

Prior to its merger with the University of Wisconsin–Oshkosh in July 2018, the campus was a member of the University of Wisconsin Colleges. As of 2017, the campus enrolls 1,286 students, making it the second largest of the UW Branch Campuses.

Academics
The campus offers a wide range of courses to begin any one of over 250 academic majors, leading to either an Associate’s degree with emphases in 25 areas, or the Guaranteed Transfer Program under which students are guaranteed admission to a four-year University of Wisconsin System campus of their choice if they meet certain academic requirements. The Fox Cities Campus also collaborates with several four-year universities to offer Bachelor’s degrees in organizational administration, leadership development, industrial management, mechanical engineering, electrical engineering, and American studies, with all classes held on campus.

University of Wisconsin–Oshkosh, Fox Cities Campus has a student-instructor ratio of 23:1; the average class size is 24 students. At least 80% of the faculty have a Ph.D. or equivalent degree. The school also offers over 30 extracurricular activities for continued learning outside the classroom.

Athletics
The Fox Cities Campus sponsors teams in golf, tennis, basketball, volleyball, and soccer. The campus is a member of the Wisconsin Collegiate Conference. Its campus mascot is the Cyclone and the campus colors are maroon, black and white.

Other features
The campus is also home to the Barlow Planetarium, a facility with a Digistar II 3-D projector, and the Weis Earth Science Museum, the official state mineralogical museum of Wisconsin. The $14-million Communication Arts Center was opened in 2009. The  building was the first LEED certified academic building in the University of Wisconsin System.

References

External links
University of Wisconsin-Oshkosh, Fox Cities Campus Homepage
Barlow Planetarium
Weis Earth Science Museum

Public universities and colleges in Wisconsin
Education in Winnebago County, Wisconsin
Buildings and structures in Winnebago County, Wisconsin
Two-year colleges in the United States
Fox Cities
Fox Cities